Ismail Abilov-Nizamoğlu (born 9 June 1951 in Lopushna, Bulgaria) is a Bulgarian  freestyle wrestler and Olympic champion.

He became Olympic champion in 1980 in the freestyle middleweight class. He has received two silver medals and one bronze medal at the FILA Wrestling World Championships.

References

External links

1951 births
Living people
Wrestlers at the 1976 Summer Olympics
Wrestlers at the 1980 Summer Olympics
Bulgarian male sport wrestlers
Olympic wrestlers of Bulgaria
Olympic gold medalists for Bulgaria
Olympic medalists in wrestling
People from Varna Province
World Wrestling Championships medalists
Medalists at the 1980 Summer Olympics
20th-century Bulgarian people
21st-century Bulgarian people